Kalmia is a genus of evergreen shrubs.

It may also refer to some locations in the United States:

 Kalmia, Maryland
 Kalmia, South Carolina, now named Langley
 Kalmia Gardens, in Hartsville, South Carolina
 The Kalmia Hills, a mountain range in California